Doğan Hancı (born September 30, 1970, in Erzurum, Turkey), is a Turkish para-archer of wheelchair class ARW2.

He became paralyzed as a result of a wrong injection.

He represented Turkey at the 2012 Summer Paralympics in the category of individual compound open and won the bronze medal scoring 671 points.

References

1970 births
Sportspeople from Erzurum
Living people
Paralympic archers of Turkey
Archers at the 2012 Summer Paralympics
Paralympic bronze medalists for Turkey
Turkish male archers
Medalists at the 2012 Summer Paralympics
Paralympic medalists in archery
Medalists at the 2008 Summer Paralympics
21st-century Turkish people